Mırra is a traditional type of bitter coffee prepared in the Hatay, Adana, Urfa and Mardin provinces of Turkey, as well as in some Arab countries like Lebanon and Syria, which is also sometimes correctly referred to as Arabic coffee because the name is derived from Arabic; mur meaning bitter. Since it is very bitter and dark, it is served in tiny cups without handles similar in size to Italian espresso cups. The coffee beans for Mırra are common coffea arabica coffee beans that are roasted twice to increase the bitter taste. They are ground so that they are still grainy, unlike Turkish coffee, which is more like a powder. The coffee is put into a narrow-topped small boiling pot called cezve, and water is added, usually accompanied by some cardamom to give a more aromatic flavour.

Mırra is boiled a couple of times until a thickish dark liquid is left. Mırra is served in another copper cezve. The person serving it fills the cup halfway and hands it to the guest, who drinks it and returns the cup to be filled halfway again and handed to the next guest. As the cup circulates among the guests, each hands it back to the server after finishing. Otherwise, according to tradition, one must fill the cup with gold, and either marry the person serving, or help them get married, or buy (if a woman) their dowry.

References

External links

Gourmet Coffee Beans

Turkish words and phrases
Coffee drinks